Digitivalva occidentella is a moth of the family Acrolepiidae. It is found in France, Spain, Italy, Croatia, Romania and on Crete. It has also been recorded from Turkey.

The larvae feed on Inula conzyza. They mine the leaves of their host plant. The mine has the form of a clear, full depth blotch in the lowest leaves. The frass is dispersed. The larvae are uniformly light green with a pale brown head. They can be found in April.

References

Acrolepiidae
Moths described in 1956
Moths of Europe
Moths of Asia